St. Paul's-Avenue Road United Church was a church in downtown Toronto.  It was founded in the 1870s.
St. Paul's Methodist Church and its home on Avenue Road just north of Bloor Street in the Yorkville community, was built in 1877.  With church union in 1925, it became St. Paul's United and in 1930 it merged with the nearby Avenue Road (formerly Presbyterian Church) and became St. Paul's-Avenue Road United.

Originally the church was that of many of Toronto's elite, but the church began to decline in the 1960s and 1970s. In 1980 the congregation merged with Trinity United Church on Bloor, west of Spadina Avenue to form Trinity-St. Paul's United Church. The congregation was based in the former Trinity building, and St. Paul's was sold to developers.  An acclaimed heritage property, there were several years of debate over what could be done with the structure. The developers hoped to demolish it, but this was blocked by the community and city council. The church became a gallery for the arts and music for several years.

In 1995, the building was destroyed by fire. Accusations of arson were leveled. The destruction of the church, leaving it open for development, tripled the value of the property overnight. The insurance company refused to pay for the damage after it found evidence that the fire was deliberate. The property was developed and today a retirement home known as Hazelton Place stands in the location.

See also
List of United Church churches in Toronto

References
"Fire guts landmark former church Avenue Rd. site designated as historical in 1979." Peter Edwards Toronto Star.Apr 25, 1995. pg. A.6

United Church of Canada churches in Toronto
Gothic Revival architecture in Toronto
Churches completed in 1877
19th-century Methodist church buildings
Former churches in Canada
Demolished buildings and structures in Toronto
Destroyed churches in Canada
Religious buildings and structures in Canada destroyed by arson
Gothic Revival church buildings in Canada
Buildings and structures demolished in 1995
1877 establishments in Ontario
19th-century churches in Canada